Lithuania, at the 1994 European Athletics Championships held in Finland. In this European Championship started 11 athletes who will represented Lithuania.

Results

Nations at the 1994 European Athletics Championships
1994
European Athletics Championships